Ictinia is a genus of birds in the family Accipitridae. It contains two species that are native to the Americas.

Taxonomy and species
The genus Ictinia was introduced in 1816 by the French ornithologist Louis Jean Pierre Vieillot to accommodate the plumbeous kite which is therefore the type species. The name is from the Ancient Greek word iktinos for a kite. The genus now contains two species.

References

 
Milvinae
Bird genera
Taxa named by Louis Jean Pierre Vieillot